= You wouldn't like me when I'm angry =

You wouldn't like me when I'm angry may refer to:

- a catchphrase of the Hulk, a comic book character
- "Youwouldn'tlikemewhenI'mangry", a 2014 song by Thom Yorke
